The 1991–92 Football League Cup (known as the Rumbelows Cup for sponsorship reasons) was the 32nd season of the Football League Cup, a knockout competition for England's top 92 association football clubs.

The competition began on 20 August 1991, and ended with the final on 12 April 1992 at the Old Wembley Stadium. The trophy was won by Manchester United for the first time.

First round

First Leg

Second Leg

Second round

First Leg

Second Leg

Third round

Ties

Replays

2nd Replay

Fourth round

Ties

Replay

Fifth Round

Ties

Replays

Semi-finals
Four time winners Nottingham Forest edged past Tottenham Hotspur to reach their sixth League Cup final in 15 years, while Manchester United overcame Middlesbrough to reach the final for the third time and be in a position to win it for the first time ever.

First Leg

Second Leg

Final

References

General

Specific

External links
Official Carling Cup website

EFL Cup seasons
1991–92 domestic association football cups
Lea
Cup